The Christmas Oratorio (German: Weihnachtsoratorium), is an oratorio by Johann Sebastian Bach intended for performance in church during the Christmas season. It is in six parts, each part a cantata intended for performance in a church service on a feast day of the Christmas period. It was written for the Christmas season of 1734 and incorporates music from earlier compositions, including three secular cantatas written during 1733 and 1734 and a largely lost church cantata, BWV 248a. The date is confirmed in Bach's autograph manuscript. The next complete public performance was not until 17 December 1857 by the Sing-Akademie zu Berlin under Eduard Grell. The Christmas Oratorio is a particularly sophisticated example of parody music. The author of the text is unknown, although a likely collaborator was Christian Friedrich Henrici (Picander).

The work belongs to a group of three oratorios written in 1734 and 1735 for major feasts, the other two works being the Ascension Oratorio (BWV 11) and the Easter Oratorio (BWV 249). All three of these oratorios to some degree parody earlier compositions. The Christmas Oratorio is by far the longest and most complex work of the three.

The first part (for Christmas Day) describes the Birth of Jesus, the second (for 26 December) the annunciation to the shepherds, the third (for 27 December) the adoration of the shepherds, the fourth (for New Year's Day) the circumcision and naming of Jesus, the fifth (for the first Sunday after New Year) the journey of the Magi, and the sixth (for Epiphany) the adoration of the Magi.

The running time for the entire oratorio is around three hours. In concert performance, it is often presented split into two parts.

History

In the liturgical calendar of the German reformation era in Saxony, the Christmas season started on 25 December (Christmas Day) and ended on 6 January (Epiphany). It was preceded by Advent, and followed by the period of the Sundays after Epiphany. It included at least three feast days that called for festive music during religious services: apart from Christmas (Nativity of Christ) and Epiphany (Visit of the Magi) the period also included New Year's Day (1 January), in Bach's time still often referred to as the Feast of the Circumcision of Christ. Also 26 and 27 December (second and third day of Christmas) were commonly considered feast days, with festive music in church. If a Sunday fell between 27 December and 1 January, also on this first Sunday after Christmas a church service with music was held, and similar for a Sunday between 1 and 6 January (second Sunday after Christmas, or: first Sunday after New Year).

1714–1729
Before Bach composed his Christmas Oratorio for the 1734–35 Christmas season in Leipzig, he had already composed Christmas cantatas and other church music for all seven occasions of the Christmas season:
 Before his Leipzig period he composed, as part of his Weimar cantata cycle:
 Christmas, : Christen, ätzet diesen Tag, BWV 63.
 First Sunday after Christmas, : Tritt auf die Glaubensbahn, BWV 152.
 For the 1723–24 Christmas season, during his first year as musical director of Leipzig's principal churches:
 Christmas Day: repeat performance of BWV 63, which thus became part of his first cantata cycle, and, as part of the Latin Church music he composed for Leipzig, his Magnificat, BWV 243a (version with Christmas interpolations) and Sanctus in D major, BWV 238.
 Second Day of Christmas: Darzu ist erschienen der Sohn Gottes, BWV 40.
 Third Day of Christmas: Sehet, welch eine Liebe hat uns der Vater erzeiget, BWV 64.
 New Year's Day: Singet dem Herrn ein neues Lied, BWV 190.
 Second Sunday after Christmas: Schau, lieber Gott, wie meine Feind, BWV 153.
 Epiphany: Sie werden aus Saba alle kommen, BWV 65.
 For the 1724–25 Christmas season, as part of his chorale cantata cycle (except for the Latin Sanctus):
 Christmas Day: Gelobet seist du, Jesu Christ, BWV 91 (early version), and Sanctus for six vocal parts, BWV 232/III (early version).
 Second Day of Christmas: Christum wir sollen loben schon, BWV 121.
 Third Day of Christmas: Ich freue mich in dir, BWV 133.
 First Sunday after Christmas (31 December): Das neugeborne Kindelein, BWV 122.
 New Year's Day: Jesu, nun sei gepreiset, BWV 41.
 Epiphany: Liebster Immanuel, Herzog der Frommen, BWV 123.
 Cantatas of Bach's third cantata cycle, for the Christmas seasons of 1725–26 and 1726–27:
 Christmas Day (1725): Unser Mund sei voll Lachens, BWV 110.
 Second Day of Christmas (1725): Selig ist der Mann, BWV 57.
 Third Day of Christmas (1725): Süßer Trost, mein Jesus kömmt, BWV 151.
 First Sunday after Christmas (30 December 1725): Gottlob! nun geht das Jahr zu Ende, BWV 28.
 New Year's Day (1726): Herr Gott, dich loben wir, BWV 16.
 Second Sunday after Christmas: Ach Gott, wie manches Herzeleid, BWV 58 (early version).

Four of these third cycle cantatas for the Christmas season, BWV 110, 57, 151 and 16, were on a text from Georg Christian Lehms's Gottgefälliges Kirchen-Opffer cantata libretto cycle, which had been published in 1711. In the second half of the 1720s Bach often collaborated with Picander as a librettist for his cantatas. The Shepherd Cantata, BWV 249a, first performed on 23 February 1725, one of Bach's secular cantatas, is an early example of such cantata. Bach reused the music of this cantata in the 1725 first version of his Easter Oratorio. Ihr Häuser des Himmels, ihr scheinenden Lichter, BWV 193a, composed in 1727, is another secular cantata on a text by Picander which was, shortly after its first performance, reworked into a sacred cantata (Ihr Tore zu Zion, BWV 193). In 1728–29 Picander published a cantata libretto cycle, leading to at least two further Christmas season cantatas by Bach:
 Christmas Day 1728, or possibly 1729: Ehre sei Gott in der Höhe, BWV 197a.
 New Year's Day 1729: Gott, wie dein Name, so ist auch dein Ruhm, BWV 171, with music in part adapted from the secular cantata, likewise on a text by Picander, Zerreißet, zersprenget, zertrümmert die Gruft, BWV 205.

A Christmas oratorio presented as a cycle of six cantatas, to be performed on several days during the Christmas period, was not uncommon in Bach's day: Gottfried Heinrich Stölzel, whose church music was not unknown to Bach and Leipzig churchgoers, had composed such Christmas oratorios in 1719 and 1728.

1730s

Models from earlier compositions
In the early 1730s, Bach composed a number of secular cantatas, including:
 Tönet, ihr Pauken!

Movements from the BWV 213, 214 and 215 cantatas form the basis of several movements of the Christmas Oratorio. In addition to these sources, the sixth cantata is based on a largely lost church cantata, BWV 248a, of which at least the opening chorus is based on the lost secular cantata BWV 1160. The trio aria in Part V "Ach, wenn wird die Zeit erscheinen?" is believed to be from a similarly lost source, and the chorus from the same section "Wo ist der neugeborne König" is from the 1731 St Mark Passion, BWV 247.

Chorales

Like for most of his German-language church music, Bach used Lutheran hymns, and their Lutheran chorale tunes, in his Christmas Oratorio. The first chorale tune appears in the 5th movement of Part I: it is the tune known as Herzlich tut mich verlangen, that is, the same hymn tune which Bach used in his St Matthew Passion for setting several stanzas of Paul Gerhardt's "O Haupt voll Blut und Wunden" ("O Sacred Head, Now Wounded"). The same melody reappears in the last movement of the oratorio (No. 64, closing chorale of Part VI). In the oratorio there is, however, no association with the pain and suffering evoked in the Passion.

Martin Luther's 1539 "Vom Himmel hoch, da komm ich her" melody appears in three chorales: twice on a text by Paul Gerhardt in Part II of the oratorio, and the first time, in the closing chorale of Part I, with the 13th stanza of Luther's hymn as text. A well-known English version of that stanza is "Oh, my dear heart, young Jesus sweet", the first stanza of "Balulalow", as, for instance, sung by Sting:

The Christmas Oratorio is exceptional in that it contains a few hymn settings, or versions of hymn tunes, for which there is no known earlier source than Bach's composition:
 The chorale melody used in No. 33 of the oratorio appears to be based on Georg Ebeling's 1666 "Warum sollt ich mich denn grämen" hymn tune. The Zahn number of Ebeling's original is 6456a. Bach's Christmas Oratorio version of the tune is Zahn 6462, first printed in 1769 as No. 143 in the second volume of Bach's four-part chorales published by Birnstiel.
 No. 38 and 40 set the first stanza of Johann Rist's "Jesu, du mein liebstes Leben" hymn text: the setting is Bach's – it is not based on any known pre-existing hymn tune.
 The tune used for Johann Rist's "Hilf, Herr Jesu, lass gelingen" hymn text in No. 42 of the oratorio appears to be an original composition by Bach. It is mentioned as such in the last volume of Johannes Zahn's , as first of four late additions to his catalogue of German Evangelical hymn tunes.

Gospel narrative
Like for his other oratorios, and his Passion settings, Bach employed a narrative based on the Gospel in his Christmas Oratorio. The Gospel narrative of this oratorio followed, to a certain extent, the respective Gospel readings of the church services where the six cantatas of the Christmas Oratorio were to be performed for the first time. The six services of the Christmas season 1734–35 where the oratorio's cantatas were to be performed had these Gospel readings:
 Christmas Day:  (theme: Nativity, Annunciation to the shepherds and the angels' song).
 Second Day of Christmas:  (theme: Adoration of the Shepherds).
 Third Day of Christmas:  – prologue of the Gospel of John, also known as Hymn to the Word.
 New Year's Day:  (theme: Circumcision of Jesus)
 Sunday after New Year:  (theme: the Flight into Egypt)
 Epiphany:  (theme: Wise Men From the East)

As usual in most of his oratorios, and all of his Passions, the Evangelist character enunciated the Gospel text in sung recitatives, except the passages in direct speech, which were sung by soloists or choral groups representing the characters who spoke these texts according to the Gospel narrative. The Gospel text included by Bach in his six Christmas Oratorio cantatas consists of:
 , i.e. part of the Christmas Day reading.
 , i.e. second half of the Christmas Day reading.
 , i.e. text of the Second Day of Christmas Gospel reading.
 , i.e. the New Year's Day Gospel reading
 , i.e. part of the Gospel reading for the Epiphany feast
 , i.e. second half of the Gospel reading for Epiphany
The Gospel readings for the Third Day of Christmas (Prologue of the Gospel of John), and for the Sunday after New Year (the Flight to Egypt) are not directly used in the Christmas Oratorio. In detail:

First performance
The oratorio was written for performance on six feast days of Christmas during the winter of 1734 and 1735. The original score also contains details of when each part was performed. It was incorporated within services of the two most important churches in Leipzig, St. Thomas and St. Nicholas. As can be seen below, the work was only performed in its entirety at the St. Nicholas Church.

First performances:
25 December 1734: Part I – 'early in the morning' at St. Nicholas; 'in the afternoon' at St. Thomas
26 December 1734: Part II – morning at St. Thomas; afternoon at St. Nicholas
27 December 1734: Part III – morning at St. Nicholas
1 January 1735: Part IV – morning at St. Thomas; afternoon at St. Nicholas
2 January 1735: Part V – morning at St Nicholas
6 January 1735: Part VI – morning at St. Thomas; afternoon at St. Nicholas

Text

The ease with which the new text fits the existing music is one of the indications of how successful a parody the Christmas Oratorio is of its sources. Musicologist Alfred Dürr and others, such as Christoph Wolff have suggested that Bach's sometime collaborator Picander (the pen name of Christian Friedrich Henrici) wrote the new text, working closely with Bach to ensure a perfect fit with the re-used music. It may have even been the case that the Christmas Oratorio was already planned when Bach wrote the secular cantatas BWV 213, 214 and 215, given that the original works were written fairly close to the oratorio and the seamless way with which the new words fit the existing music.

Nevertheless, on two occasions Bach abandoned the original plan and was compelled to write new music for the Christmas Oratorio. The alto aria in Part III, "Schließe, mein Herze" was originally to have been set to the music for the aria "Durch die von Eifer entflammten Waffen" from BWV 215. On this occasion, however, the parody technique proved to be unsuccessful and Bach composed the aria afresh. Instead, he used the model from BWV 215 for the bass aria "Erleucht' auch meine finstre Sinnen" in Part V. Similarly, the opening chorus to Part V, "Ehre sei dir Gott!" was almost certainly intended to be set to the music of the chorus "Lust der Völker, Lust der Deinen" from BWV 213, given the close correspondence between the texts of the two pieces. The third major new piece of writing (with the notable exception of the recitatives), the sublime pastoral Sinfonia which opens Part II, was composed from scratch for the new work.

In addition to the new compositions listed above, special mention must go to the recitatives, which knit together the oratorio into a coherent whole. In particular, Bach made particularly effective use of recitative when combining it with chorales in no. 7 of part I ("Er ist auf Erden kommen arm") and even more ingeniously in the recitatives nos. 38 and 40 which frame the "Echo Aria" ("Flößt, mein Heiland"), no. 39 in part IV.

Until 1999 the only complete English version of the Christmas Oratorio was that prepared in 1874 by John Troutbeck for the music publisher Novello. A new edition has been worked up by Neil Jenkins.

Narrative structure
The structure of the story is defined to a large extent by the particular requirements of the church calendar for Christmas 1734/35. Bach abandoned his usual practice when writing church cantatas of basing the content upon the Gospel reading for that day in order to achieve a coherent narrative structure. Were he to have followed the calendar, the story would have unfolded as follows:
Birth and Annunciation to the Shepherds
The Adoration of the Shepherds
Prologue to the Gospel of John
Circumcision and Naming of Jesus
The Flight into Egypt
The Coming and Adoration of the Magi
This would have resulted in the Holy Family fleeing before the Magi had arrived, which was unsuitable for an oratorio evidently planned as a coherent whole. Bach removed the content for the Third Day of Christmas (27 December), John's Gospel, and split the story of the two groups of visitors—Shepherds and Magi—into two. This resulted in a more understandable exposition of the Christmas story:
The Birth
The Annunciation to the Shepherds
The Adoration of the Shepherds
The Circumcision and Naming of Jesus
The Journey of the Magi
The Adoration of the Magi
The Flight into Egypt takes place after the end of the sixth part.

That Bach saw the six parts as comprising a greater, unified whole is evident both from the surviving printed text and from the structure of the music itself. The edition has not only a title—Weihnachts-Oratorium—connecting together the six sections, but these sections are also numbered consecutively. As John Butt has mentioned, this points, as in the Mass in B minor, to a unity beyond the performance constraints of the church year.

Music
Bach expresses the unity of the whole work within the music itself, in part through his use of key signatures. Parts I and III are written in the keys of D major, part II in its subdominant key G major. Parts I and III are similarly scored for exuberant trumpets, while the Pastoral Part II (referring to the Shepherds) is, by contrast, scored for woodwind instruments and does not include an opening chorus. Part IV is written in F major (the relative key to D minor) and marks the furthest musical point away from the oratorio's opening key, scored for horns. Bach then embarks upon a journey back to the opening key, via the dominant A major of Part V to the jubilant re-assertion of D major in the final part, lending an overall arc to the piece. To reinforce this connection, between the beginning and the end of the work, Bach re-uses the chorale melody of Part I's "Wie soll ich dich empfangen" in the final chorus of Part VI, "Nun seid ihr wohl gerochen"; this choral melody is the same as of "O Haupt voll Blut und Wunden", which Bach used five times in his St Matthew Passion.

The music represents a particularly sophisticated expression of the parody technique, by which existing music is adapted to a new purpose. Bach took the majority of the choruses and arias from works which had been written some time earlier. Most of this music was 'secular', that is written in praise of royalty or notable local figures, outside the tradition of performance within the church.

Instrumentation
The scoring below refers to parts, rather than necessarily to individual players. Adherents of theories specifying small numbers of performers (even to 'One Voice Per Part') may however choose to use numbers approaching one instrument per named part.

Part I 3 trumpets, timpani, 2 transverse flutes, 2 oboes (both of which double on oboe d'amore) 2 violins, viola, continuo group
Part II 2 flutes, 2 oboes d'amore, 2 oboes da caccia, 2 violins, viola, continuo
Part III 3 trumpets, timpani, 2 flutes, 2 oboes (both of which double on oboe d'amore), 2 violins, viola, continuo
Part IV 2 horns, 2 oboes, 2 violins, viola, continuo
Part V 2 oboes d'amore, 2 violins, viola, continuo
Part VI 3 trumpets, timpani, 2 oboes (both of which double on oboe d'amore), 2 violins, viola, continuo

Notes

Parts and numbers
Each section combines choruses (a pastoral Sinfonia opens Part II instead of a chorus), chorales and from the soloists recitatives, ariosos and arias.

By notational convention the recitatives are in common time.

Part I

Part II

{| class="wikitable"
|+Part II: For the Second Day of Christmas
!No.!! !!Key!!Time!!First line!!Scoring!!Source – Audio
|-
|10||Sinfonia||G major||12/8||—||2 flutes, 2 oboe d'amore, 2 oboe da caccia, strings, continuo ||

|-
|11||colspan=3|Recitative (Evangelist, tenor)||Und es waren Hirten in derselben Gegend||Continuo||

|-
|12||Chorale||G major||Common||Brich an, o schönes Morgenlicht||2 flutes, 2 oboe d'amore, 2 oboe da caccia, strings, continuo||"Ermuntre dich, mein schwacher Geist", v. 9 (Johann Rist, 1641); Zahn 5741 (Johann Schop, 1641)

|-
|13||colspan=3|Recitative (Evangelist, tenor; Angel, soprano)||Und der Engel sprach zu ihnenFürchtet euch nicht||Strings, continuo||

|-
|14||colspan=3|Recitative (bass)||Was Gott dem Abraham verheißen||2 oboe d'amore, 2 oboe da caccia, strings, continuo||

|-
|15||Aria (tenor)||E minor||3/8||Frohe Hirten, eilt, ach eilet||Flute I, continuo||BWV 214: Aria, Fromme Musen! meine Glieder

|-
|16||colspan=3|Recitative (Evangelist, tenor)||Und das habt zum Zeichen||Continuo||

|-
|17||Chorale||C major||Common||Schaut hin! dort liegt im finstern Stall||2 flutes, 2 oboe d'amore, 2 oboe da caccia, strings, continuo||"Schaut, schaut, was ist für Wunder dar", v. 8 (Paul Gerhardt, 1667); Zahn 346 (Martin Luther, 1539)

|-
|18||colspan=3|Recitative (bass)||So geht denn hin!||2 oboe d'amore, 2 oboe da caccia, continuo||

|-
|19||Aria (alto)||G maj/||2/4||Schlafe, mein Liebster, genieße der Ruh'''||Flute I (colla parte an octave above the alto soloist throughout), 2 oboe d'amore, 2 oboe da caccia, strings, continuo||BWV 213: Aria, Schlafe, mein Liebster, und pflege der Ruh|-
|20||colspan=3|Recitative (Evangelist, tenor)||Und alsobald war da bei dem Engel||Continuo||

|-
|21||Chorus||G major||Split Common (2/2)||Ehre sei Gott in der Höhe||2 flutes, 2 oboe d'amore, 2 oboe da caccia, strings, continuo||

|-
|22||colspan=3|Recitative (bass)||So recht, ihr Engel, jauchzt und singet||Continuo||

|-
|23||Chorale||G major||12/8||Wir singen dir in deinem Heer||2 flutes, 2 oboe d'amore, 2 oboe da caccia, strings, continuo||"Wir singen dir, Immanuel", v. 2 (Paul Gerhardt, 1656); Zahn 346 (Martin Luther, 1539)

|}

Part III

Part IV

Part V

Part VI

{| class="wikitable"
|+Part VI: For the Feast of Epiphany
!No.!! !!Key!!Time!!First line!!Scoring!!Source
|-
|54||Chorus||D major||3/8||Herr, wenn die stolzen Feinde schnauben||Trumpet I, II, III, timpani, oboe I, II, strings, continuo||BWV 248a (lost church cantata)
|-
|55||colspan=3|Recitative (Evangelist, tenor; Herod, bass)||Da berief Herodes die Weisen heimlichZiehet hin und forschet fleißig||Continuo||
|-
|56||colspan=3|Recitative (soprano)||Du Falscher, suche nur den Herrn zu fällen||Strings, continuo||BWV 248a (lost church cantata)
|-
|57||Aria (soprano)||A maj/||3/4||Nur ein Wink von seinen Händen||Oboe d'amore I, strings, continuo||BWV 248a (lost church cantata)
|-
|58||colspan=3|Recitative (Evangelist, tenor)||Als sie nun den König gehöret hatten||Continuo||
|-
|59||Chorale||G major||Common||Ich steh an deiner Krippen hier||Oboe I, II, strings, continuo||Words: Paul Gerhardt, 1656
|-
|60||colspan=3|Recitative (Evangelist, tenor)||Und Gott befahl ihnen im Traum'||Continuo||
|-
|61||colspan=3|Recitative (tenor)||So geht! Genug, mein Schatz geht nicht von hier||Oboe d'amore I, II, continuo||BWV 248a (lost church cantata)
|-
|62||Aria (tenor)||B minor||2/4||Nun mögt ihr stolzen Feinde schrecken||Oboe d'amore I, II, continuo||BWV 248a (lost church cantata)
|-
|63||colspan=3|Recitative (soprano, alto, tenor, bass)||Was will der Höllen Schrecken nun||Continuo||BWV 248a (lost church cantata)
|-
|64||Chorale||D major||Common||Nun seid ihr wohl gerochen||Trumpet I, II, III, timpani, oboe I, II, strings, continuo||BWV 248a (lost church cantata); Words: Georg Werner, 1648
|}

Reception

The first English-language monograph on the Christmas Oratorio'' was published in 2004.

Recordings

References

Cited sources 
 
 
  Preface in English and German.

Further reading

External links

Complete text and instrumentation: Part I, Part II, Part III, Part IV, Part V, Part VI 
Bach Cantatas Website: Details, recordings & reviews
Donald Satz: A Bottomless Bucket of Bach – Christmas Oratorio (April 2000): Details and comparison of four recordings

Video with John Eliot Gardiner, English Baroque Soloists, Monteverdi Choir: part 1 (cantatas 1–3) part 2 (cantatas 4–6)
Video with Nicolas Harnoncourt, Concentus Musicus, 1982

Passions and oratorios by Johann Sebastian Bach
1734 compositions
Christmas in Germany
Christmas music
Compositions with natural trumpets in D
Christmas cantatas
Oratorios based on the Bible
Epiphany music